Peter Vincent may refer to:

People
In alphabetical order.
Peter Vincent, New Zealander businessman, founder of airline company Vincent Aviation
Peter Vincent Addyman (born 1939), British archeologist
Peter V. Delaney (Peter Vincent Delaney) (1936–2002), Irish surgeon
Peter Doucette (Peter Vincent Doucette) (1954–2019), Canadian politician
Peter Vincent Douglas (born 1955), American film and television producer, son of Kirk Douglas
Peter Kearns (Peter Vincent Kearns) (1937–2014), British football player
Peter Vincent Kocot (1956–2018), American politician
Peter Vincent Korda (born 1921), only child of Hungarian film executives Alexander Korda and María Corda
Peter Vincent Marks (born 1949), British businessman, former owner of The Co-operative Group
Cactus Pete Piersanti (Peter Vincent Piersanti) (1916–1994), American entrepreneur and promoter
Peter Ridd (Peter Vincent Ridd) (born 1960), Australian physicist and author
Peter Vincent Scamurra (born 1955), American ice hockey player

Fictional characters
Peter Vincent, a fictional character in the 1938 film Island in the Sky
Professor Peter Vincent, a fictional character in the 1943 film Lost Angel
Lieutenant Peter Vincent, a fictional character in the 1944 film The Purple Heart
Peter Vincent, a fictional character in the Fright Night franchise

Other uses
Peter Vincent Music (1958–1962), a music publishing company formed by Kirk Douglas